Juan Carlos Quintero Herencia], born in Santurce, Puerto Rico in 1963, is a literary voice from the Puerto Rican literary scene. Member and co-editor of the Poetry journal Filo de juego (1982–1987) the Instituto de Cultura Puertorriqueña published, in 2002, his early poetry under a volume entitled El hilo para el marisco/Cuaderno de los envíos (2002). This volume received the Puerto Rican Pen Club Poetry Prize in 2004. Quintero Herencia has published other collections of poetry such as La caja negra (1996, Isla Negra) and Libro del sigiloso (2007, Terranova). Quintero Herencia's poetry is complex and contains an intense desire for experimentation and baroque imagery. In Quintero's recent poetry a concern for the specific nature of the political gesture of poetry is a recurrent topic. As an essayist Quintero-Herencia established himself with Fulguración del espacio: Letras e imaginario institucional de la Revolución cubana (1960–1971) (Beatriz Viterbo, 2002), a contextual and critical reading of the crucial debates which defined the Cuban intellectual field during the 1960s. His second book, La máquina de la salsa: Tránsitos del sabor (Ediciones Vértigo, 2005) has been hailed by Puerto Rican critics as the most comprehensive critical balance on the Salsa phenomenon. As a Professor, Quintero-Herencia teaches undergraduate and graduate courses in Latin American and Caribbean literatures and cultures at the University of Maryland, College Park (United States). He also teaches Literary Theory. Before going to the University of Maryland, he taught at the University of Puerto Rico, Río Piedras and Brown University.

See also 

 Puerto Rican literature
 Puerto Rican poetry

References

Sources
 http://www.habanaelegante.com/Fall2005/Expresion.html
 https://doi.org/10.1111/j.1540-5931.2006.00213.x
 https://web.archive.org/web/20070824233808/http://www1.uprh.edu/zjimenez/GENERACION%2080/bibliografia_generacional.htm
 https://web.archive.org/web/20120618005021/http://www.revistacruce.com/letras/libro-del-sigiloso.html#.T7o3b_7IK54.email
 https://web.archive.org/web/20121003004153/http://revistacruce.com/columnistas/juan-quintero-herencia.html

1963 births
Living people
Spanish male writers